How Many Votes Fix Mix is the second EP released in 2008 by the musician M.I.A. (see 2008 in music). It was released on October 28, 2008 by XL Recordings/Interscope Records and made available on iTunes. It received a full release on November 4, 2008. A previously unheard track "Shells" was released with a remix of "Boyz"  with Jay-Z and "Far Far", a bonus track from M.I.A.'s second album Kala.

Track listing
Credits adapted from the liner notes of the expanded edition of Kala.

Critical reception

References

2008 EPs